Ampelu is a village in the Batang Hari Regency in the Jambi Province of Sumatra, Indonesia.

Nearby towns and villages include Kermio (3.6 nm), Benteng (5.8 nm), Muaratembesi (3.6 nm), Terusan (5.8 nm), and Jebak (4.1 nm).

References

External links
Satellite map at Maplandia.com

Populated places in Jambi